The 20th Naples Grand Prix was a motor race, run for cars complying with the Formula One rules, held on 20 May 1962 at Posillipo Circuit, Naples. The race was run over 60 laps of the circuit, and was won by Belgian driver Willy Mairesse in a Ferrari 156.

This race was held on the same day as the 1962 Dutch Grand Prix, and consequently many of the top drivers at that time were not present in Naples. Only the 10 fastest cars in qualifying were allowed to start the race, leaving a number of the more unusual entrants on the sidelines. The two Ferraris were dominant throughout the weekend, with Lorenzo Bandini leading from the start of the race until lap 24, when he was passed by Mairesse, who led until the end. Carlo Abate finished fourth in his first Formula One race, narrowly beaten by Keith Greene.

Qualifying

Results

References

 "The Grand Prix Who's Who", Steve Small, 1995.
 "The Formula One Record Book", John Thompson, 1974, pp. 86–87.
 Race results at www.silhouet.com 

Naples Grand Prix
Grand Prix of Naples